The list of ancient spiral stairs contains a selection of Greco-Roman spiral stairs constructed during classical antiquity. The spiral stair is a type of stairway which, due to its complex helical structure, has been introduced relatively late into architecture. Although the oldest example dates back to the 5th century BC, it was only in the wake of the influential design of the Trajan's Column that this space-saving new type permanently caught hold in ancient Roman architecture.

Apart from the triumphal columns in the imperial cities of Rome and Constantinople, other types of buildings such as temples, thermae, basilicas and tombs were also fitted with spiral stairways. Their notable absence in the towers of the Aurelian Wall indicates that they did not yet figure prominently in Roman military engineering. By late antiquity, separate stair towers were constructed adjacent to the main buildings, like in the Basilica of San Vitale.

The construction of spiral stairs passed on both to Christian and Islamic architecture.

Spiral stairs

Gallery

See also 
 Greek architecture
 Greek technology
 Roman technology
 Roman engineering

Footnotes

References

Bibliography

Further reading

External links 

 Traianus – Technical investigation of Roman public works

Stairs
ancient spiral stairs
Spiral stairs
spiral stairs
spiral stairs
List of spiral stairs
Ancient spiral stairs
Ancient spiral stairs
Spiral